"Earthwar" is a story arc that was published by DC Comics, and presented in Superboy and the Legion of Super-Heroes #241-245 (July–November 1978). It was written by Paul Levitz, pencilled by James Sherman and Joe Staton and inked by Bob McLeod. The story arc features the efforts of the Legion of Super-Heroes to halt a massive intergalactic war involving the United Planets, the Khunds, the Dominators, the Dark Circle and the sorcerer Mordru.

The story arc also features the first appearance of Shvaughn Erin, a long-running supporting character in the various Legion titles.

Plot
United Planets Ambassador Relnic summons Mon-El, Ultra Boy, Wildfire and Dawnstar to Weber's World to protect a diplomatic conference between the U.P. and the Dominion, while many of their fellow Legionnaires battle the Resource Raiders on and above Earth. The sudden dual crisis prevents Science Police officer Shvaughn Erin from informing the team that one of its enemies has escaped imprisonment. The Legion prevails over the Raiders, only to discover that they were advance scouts preceding a Khundian invasion of Earth. While the team struggles against the massive invasion fleet, Superboy, Element Lad, Sun Boy and Colossal Boy take the fight to Khundia (the Khund homeworld), where they learn that the Khund warlord Garlak is being telepathically manipulated by an outside force – which they trace back to Weber's World.

The Legionnaires prevent a pair of assassins from killing the Dominion diplomatic delegation at Weber's World, but it is only one in a series of events seemingly designed to disrupt the peace conference. When Relnic and the Dominators suddenly vanish without a trace, the Legionnaires decide to return to Earth. Along the way, they locate a space station and discover the missing Dominators, who inform them that Relnic is a Dark Circle agent. Meanwhile, the Khundian fleet penetrates the U.P. defenses and lands on Earth, with both the regular Legion and the Legion of Substitute Heroes unable to stop them. As the Khunds approach Legion Headquarters, the only ones remaining to defend the complex are the four Legionnaires who were forced to retire upon marriage: Lightning Lad, Saturn Girl, Bouncing Boy and Duo Damsel. After the four of them successfully defend Legion HQ, Saturn Girl telepathically probes one of the Khundish commanders, learning that reinforcements sent by the Dark Circle are approaching the planet. Officer Erin fends off Khundian troops at Science Police HQ with the assistance of Karate Kid, who returns from the 20th century.

At Earth's Presidential Palace, the returning Legionnaires locate their comrades who were captured in battle with the Khunds, but are now being held by members of the Dark Circle. The Circle agents attempt to destroy Earth using a sphere of negative matter. Superboy, Mon-El, Ultra Boy, and Wildfire block most of the negasphere's energy as it is released, but the palace is demolished. Only a handful of Legionnaires are conscious when one of the Circle agents (who had been masquerading as Ambassador Relnic) reveals himself to be the escaped foe that Erin tried to warn the Legion about earlier: the sorcerer Mordru.

Having skillfully manipulated the Resource Raiders, the Khunds, the Dark Circle and the events on Weber's World, Mordru seizes control of Earth. After a brief retreat, Superboy, Lightning Lad, Saturn Girl and Karate Kid rescue the imprisoned Legionnaires and Substitute Heroes. In orbit above Earth, Mordru fends off the entire group of heroes, until Element Lad is able to transmute the free-floating hydrogen atoms surrounding the sorcerer into soil. Having been effectively imprisoned underground, Mordru is defeated. In the aftermath of the crisis, the Khunds and the Dark Circle are driven out of United Planets territory. The U.P. and the Dominion sign an extended peace treaty. The Legion unanimously amends its constitution to allow married Legionnaires to remain on active duty. Lightning Lad and Saturn Girl opt to return to the team, while Bouncing Boy and Duo Damsel decline to do so.

References

Comics by Paul Levitz
Legion of Super-Heroes storylines